Herman Iorwase Hembe (born 22 June 1975) is a Nigerian politician and lawyer from Konshisha local government area of Benue State in north central Nigeria who serves as a member of the 9th Assembly in the House of Representatives of Nigeria where he represents Vandeikya/Konshisha Federal Constituency. Hembe is the flagbearer of the Labour party in the 2023 Benue governorship election, having previously contested unsuccessfully under the All Progressives Congress (APC).

References 

Living people
Nigerian politicians
1975 births